András Radó (born 9 September 1993) is a Hungarian professional footballer who plays as an attacking midfielder for Vasas.

Career
In his first full season with Szombathelyi Haladás Radó scored two goals, and made eight assists. In the 2012–13 season he had seven goals and seven assists.

On 2 April 2016, Radó became Hungarian League champion with Ferencvárosi TC after losing to Debreceni VSC 2–1 at the Nagyerdei Stadion in the 2015–16 Nemzeti Bajnokság I season.

Career statistics

References

External links
HLSZ

1993 births
Living people
People from Pápa
Hungarian footballers
Hungary under-21 international footballers
Hungary youth international footballers
Association football midfielders
Szombathelyi Haladás footballers
Ferencvárosi TC footballers
Puskás Akadémia FC players
Zalaegerszegi TE players
Vasas SC players
Nemzeti Bajnokság I players
Nemzeti Bajnokság II players
Sportspeople from Veszprém County